K-1 World MAX 2008 World Championship Tournament - Final - was a martial arts event promoted by the K-1 organization. It took place on Wednesday, October 1, 2008 at the Nippon Budokan Arena in Tokyo, Japan. It was the 7th annual K-1 World Max (70 kg/154 lbs weight class) World Championship Final, featuring four quarter final winners of K-1 World MAX 2008 Final 8 held on July 7, 2008 in Tokyo, Japan. The card also included a couple of tournament reserve bouts, two Superfights between Takayuki Kohiruimaki vs Joerie Mes and Nieky Holzken vs. Virgil Kalakoda, the ISKA World Lightweight Title Match plus the quarterfinals in K-1's new Koshien King of U-18 series.  The four quarter final winners of the K-1 Koshien bouts would qualify for the semi finals at the Dynamite!! 2008 event.

The K-1 World Max 2008 Final attracted a sellout crowd of 15,321 to the Nippon Budokan and was broadcast live in Japan on the TBS network.

Rule changes 
In a press conference at Tokyo's Laforet Hotel, prior to the event, the Event Producer Sadaharu Tanikawa announced a number of rule changes effective on October 1, 2008.
 K-1 World MAX fighter costumes may not cover the body below the knee or above the waist.
 No oil, lotion or potentially stimulative or irritating substances can be applied to any part of the body. Only a minimal amount of vaseline can only be applied to the face and ears. 
 Introducing an "open-scoring" system, whereby the judges' cards will be revealed for the fighters and their cornermen as well as fans at the conclusion of each round.

K-1 World MAX 2008 Tournament

Results  

Opening Fight: K-1 Rules / 3Min. 3R Ext.1R
Nieky Holzken  def. Virgil Kalakoda  
Holzken defeated Kalakoda by KO (Right Hook) at 1:42 of the 1st Round.

K-1 Koushien Final 8 (60 kg): K-1 Rules / 3Min. 3R
Koya Urabe  def. Yusuke Tsuboi  
Urabe defeated Tsuboi by TKO (Corner Stoppage) at 0:54 of the 3rd Round.

Shota Shimada  def. Ryo Murakoshi  
Shimada defeated Murakoshi by 3rd Round Unanimous Decision 3-0 (30-26, 30-26, 30-26).

Ryuya Kusakabe  def. Daizo Sasaki  
Kusakabe defeated Sasaki by TKO at 2:43 of the 1st Round.

Hiroya  def. Taishi Hiratsuka  
Hiroya defeated Hiratsuka by KO (Left Hook) at 0:24 of the 1st Round.

Super Fights: K-1 Rules / 3Min. 3R Ext.1R
Joerie Mes  def. Taishin Kohiruimaki  
Mes defeated Kohiruimaki by KO (Left Hook) at 2:59 of the 3rd Round.

Reserve Fight 1: K-1 MAX Rules / 3Min. 3R Ext.1R
Albert Kraus  def. Yasuhiro Kido  
Kraus defeated Kido by TKO (Doctor Stoppage) at 0:48 of the 2nd Round.

Semi Finals: K-1 MAX Rules / 3Min. 3R Ext.1R
Masato  def. Yoshihiro Sato  
Masato defeated Sato by Extra Round Unanimous Decision 3-0 (10-9, 10-9, 10-9).  After 3 rounds the judges scored it a Majority Draw 1-0 (29-28, 28-28, 28-28) in favour of Sato.

Artur Kyshenko  def. Andy Souwer  
Kyshenko defeated Souwer by Extra Round Unanimous Decision 3-0 (10-9, 10-9, 10-9).  After 3 rounds the judges scored it a Decision Draw 0-0, (30-30, 30-30, 30-30).

Reserve Fight 2: K-1 MAX Rules / 3Min. 3R Ext.1R
Buakaw Por. Pramuk  def. Kultar Gill  
Por. Pramuk defeated Gill by KO (Right Hook) at 2:18 of the 1st Round.

Super Fight (60 kg): K-1 Rules / 3Min. 3R Ext.1R
Haruaki Otsuki  def. Ryuji Kajiwara  
Otsuki defeated Kajiwara by 3rd Round Unanimous Decision 3-0 (30-28, 30-28, 30-28).

ISKA Lightweight World Title Fight (60 kg): Kickboxing Rules / 3Min. 3R Ext.2R
Daisuke Uematsu  def. Susumu Daiguji  
Uematsu defeated Daiguji by KO (Left Knee) at 0:29 of the 1st Round.

Final: K-1 MAX Rules / 3Min. 3R Ext.2R
Masato  def. Artur Kyshenko  
Masato defeated Kyshenko by Extra Round Unanimous Decision 3-0 (10-9, 10-9, 10-9).  After 3 rounds the judges scored it a Majority Draw 1-0 (28-28, 28-27, 28-28) in favor of Masato.  Masato is the K-1 World MAX 2008 tournament champion.

See also
 List of K-1 Events
 List of male kickboxers

References

External links
 K-1 Official Website
 K-1sport.de - Your Source for Everything K-1

K-1 MAX events
2008 in kickboxing
Kickboxing in Japan
Sports competitions in Tokyo